Typotheque is a type foundry and design studio from The Hague, Netherlands  that develops and markets original typefaces. In October 2009, Typotheque became the first type foundry to introduce the concept of webfonts. The typefaces sold under the Typotheque foundry label are mostly designed by Peter Biľak, including the popular Home Fedra Sans and Fedra Serif font families. Typotheque specializes in creation of Latin and non-Latin fonts (Cyrillic, Greek, Arabic, Hebrew) and publishes books, such as We Want You To Love Type  Dot Dot Dot, or the magazine of unexpected creativity Works That Work.

Typotheque's work has been profiled in the design publications Abitare, Cap & Design, Designum, Druk, Dwell, Etapes, Emigre, I.D., Idea, Novum, Page, Print, Publish, and tipoGrafica. Typotheque's work has been recognized by the Type Directors Club.

Typotheque's clients including Mozilla Foundation and Sandoll Communications.

References

External links 
 Typotheque type foundry
 Middendorp, Jan. Dutch Type. 010 publishers: 2004. .
 Fedra Sans selected by FontShop as number 40 amongst 100 Best typefaces of all times.

Companies based in The Hague
Type foundries